Palanasaspis chekhivensis is an extinct species of pteraspidid heterostracan agnathan which existed during the Pragian epoch of the early Devonian period in what is now Podolia, Ukraine.  It is known primarily from a wide rostral plate, which is referenced in the generic name, a compound word combining the Latin words pala, "shovel," and nasus, "nose," with the Greek suffix aspis, "a small shield."  Although the rostral plate clearly marks the creature as a pteraspidoid heterostracan, that literally nothing else of its anatomy is known forces researchers to leave it as incertae sedis.

References

Pteraspidiformes genera
Devonian jawless fish
Early Devonian fish
Early Devonian fish of Europe
Heterostraci enigmatic taxa
Early Devonian first appearances
Early Devonian genus extinctions
Pragian life